Chalice Hymnal is the seventh studio album by American band Grails. It was released on February 17, 2017 through Temporary Residence Limited.

Track listing

References

2017 albums
Grails (band) albums
Temporary Residence Limited albums